Gerardo "Dinggoy" Araneta Roxas Jr. (October 21, 1960 – April 4, 1993), popularly known simply as Dinggoy Roxas and sometimes referred as Gerry Roxas Jr., was a Filipino politician who served as a former congressman from Capiz. He was the brother of former Senator and Secretary of the Interior and Local Government Mar Roxas and grandson of former President Manuel Roxas.

Early life
Born Gerardo Araneta Roxas Jr. on October 21, 1960 in Manila, Philippines to Gerardo Roxas (1924–1982) of Capiz and Judy Araneta of Bago, Negros Occidental. Roxas' father was a senator from 1963 to 1972 and was the only son of Manuel Roxas, the fifth President of the Philippines, and Trinidad de Leon. The couple married in 1955. He has two siblings, namely Maria "Ria" Lourdes, married to Augusto Ojeda and mother of three, and Mar Roxas, married to broadcaster Korina Sanchez with his son Paolo Roxas and twins Pilar and Pepe.

Like his father before him, he joined the Upsilon Sigma Phi while studying at the University of the Philippines.

Political life
Roxas ran for a seat in the House of Representatives of the Philippines in the May 11, 1987 Philippine legislative election at the age of 26 and became the youngest elected representative at age 26.

Death
Roxas died on April 4, 1993 from colon cancer months after another Capiz representative, Cornelio Villareal, died. He is buried at Manila North Cemetery in Santa Cruz, Manila.

Legacy
Dinggoy Araneta Roxas Elementary School - Quezon City 
Dinggoy Roxas Civic Center - Roxas City, Capiz 
Dinggoy Roxas Memorial Park - Roxas City, Capiz 
Gerry Roxas Foundation - Quezon City

References

|-

1960 births
1993 deaths
Gerardo
People from Capiz
People from Quezon City
Filipino Roman Catholics
Ateneo de Manila University alumni
Members of the House of Representatives of the Philippines from Capiz
Araneta family
Liberal Party (Philippines) politicians
Deaths from cancer in the Philippines
Deaths from colorectal cancer
Burials at the Manila North Cemetery
Visayan people